Governor McLean may refer to:

Angus Wilton McLean (1870–1935), 56th Governor of North Carolina
Fitzroy J. Grafton McLean (fl. 1800s–1810s), Governor of St. Thomas, St. John from 1807 to 1815
George P. McLean (1857–1932), 59th Governor of Connecticut